Anjum Shahzad is a Pakistani TV and film director, producer, writer, actor and a philanthropist. Shahzad rose to fame and is best known for his role as Bobby in the critically acclaimed and madly-followed comedy series Family Front in the 90s. The situational comedy earned him PTV Award for Best Debut Actor for his role as Bobby.

Though he earned his M.A. in economics from Punjab University, his passion for the performing arts led him to a drama school in Lahore where he completed a long course in theatre arts. His mentors include Pakistani TV and theatre legends, such as Shoaib Hashmi, Salman Shahid and Samina Ahmed. His passion led him to attend workshops and take up courses in all major fields of performing and visual arts in Pakistan as well as abroad. He had a knack for live performances which compelled him to stage a number of puppet shows and street theatre for a long time with a number of groups, including Ajoka and ACPC.

Soon after the success of his character Bobby in Family Front in the late 90s, he stopped seeking roles for acting on screen, to pursue a successful career in direction, and has directed some of most popular drama serials such as Mora Piya, Mirat-ul-Uroos, Rang Laaga, Khuda Aur Muhabbat,  Satrangi, Dusri Bivi, Mera Yaar Miladay, Khaani, Romeo Weds Heer and critically acclaimed telefilm Armaan.

He debuted as film director in 2016 with a biopic Mah-e-Mir   inspired by the life of a genius Urdu poet of 18th century, Mir Taqi Mir, with semi-fictional elements.

Shehzad's Mah-e-Mir was screened as part of the official selection of the Guam International Film Festival, which included around 60 films, according to its website. The film picked up the Best Narrative Film award at the festival.

Later that year, his debut masterpiece won Best Film and Best Music awards at India's most prestigious awards at the Dada Saheb Film Festival, held in Delhi.

 Mah e Mir was selected by the Pakistani Academy Selection Committee as the Pakistan's Official entry for the Best Foreign Language Film at the 89th Academy Awards.

Anjum Shahzad's 2nd Film Zindagi Kitni Haseen Hai was released in Pakistan right after the buzz of Mah-e-Mir, across the world. Earlier, Shahzad received his 3rd Best TV Director award at 15th Lux Style Awards for Rang Laaga.

Noted works

Films 
 Armaan (2013)
 Mah-e-Mir (2016)
 Zindagi Kitni Haseen Hay (2016)

Television
 As Actor 
 Family Front as Bobby (1997)
 Kyun? (narrator)
 "College Jeans"  (2000)

 As Director
 Dil e Nadaan
 Romeo Weds Heer 
 Khaani
 Mera Yaar Miladay 
 Babu Ji Dheere Chalna
 Pehla Chand
 Thoda Thoda Pyar
 Rang Laaga
 Mirat-ul-Uroos 
 Dusri Bivi 
 Kabhi Kabhi 
 Khuda Aur Muhabbat   
 Satrangi
 Jinnah Ke Naam
 Khaani
 Romeo Weds Heer
 Darr Khuda Say
 Pehli Si Muhabbat

 As Producer 
 Footpath
 Qutubuddins
 Dil-e-Nadan

 As Writer
 Armaan (2013)

Awards

References

External links

 - official website 
 

Living people
Pakistani television directors
Pakistani television producers
Urdu film producers
Pakistani television writers
Pakistani male television actors
Year of birth missing (living people)
People from Karachi
Male television writers